Gold Field is a Russian drama TV series from Fenix Film which premiered on Fenix-Art in 2006. Its director is Alexei Kozlov. It stars Yaroslav Boyko as a geologist Sergei Romanov.

The series tells the story of a tiny Siberian gold field settlement and its dwellers involved in the turbulent events.

The first season of the series had gained positive reviews consequently the second season (The Gold Field: Gold Rush) was filmed and aired in 2007.

Cast
 Alexey Zubkov as Gennady Tomilin
 Yaroslav Boyko as Sergey Romanov, a geologist
 Nikolai Dobrynin as Kolya Dvoryanin
 Leonid Kulagin as Sluzhaev
 Kira Kreylis-Petrova as Geltuciha

External links
 

Russian television miniseries
2006 Russian television series debuts
2007 Russian television series endings
2000s Russian television series
Russian drama television series